Scottsmoor is an unincorporated community and census-designated place in the north end of Brevard County, Florida, United States.  It is on U.S. 1, and also the northernmost settlement in the county.  It is a farming community east of Interstate 95, similar to Malabar.

The community is part of the Palm Bay–Melbourne–Titusville Metropolitan Statistical Area.

Geography
It is situated at the north end of Brevard County. Bounded by the north is Volusia County; on the west  by Interstate 95; on the east by the Indian River Lagoon; and on the south is Aurantia. Including precinct 106.

Climate

History
Scottsmoor was settled in 1861 by James Garvin, who acquired the land through the Spanish Land Grant. The town gained resort community status in the 1920s. Today, all of the resorts have moved to Titusville because of its proximity to John F. Kennedy Space Center.

See also
Malabar, Florida

References

External links

Scottsmoor Community Association

Unincorporated communities in Brevard County, Florida
Populated places established in 1861
Unincorporated communities in Florida
Former municipalities in Florida
1861 establishments in Florida